Apamea schildei is a species of moth belonging to the family Noctuidae.

It is native to Northern Europe.

References

Noctuidae
Moths described in 1901